WOON (1240 AM) is Woonsocket, Rhode Island's oldest radio station, having taken to the air on November 11, 1946 as WWON, a callsign it kept until the current WOON became available in 1992. The change in call became effective on February 3, 1992. On June 26, 1949 WWON added a sister station with WWON-FM on 105.5Mc/s. later moving to 106.3Mc/s. That station is now WWKX.

WWON was owned by the local newspaper The Woonsocket Call for a time. It is currently owned by O-N Radio, Inc. WOON's programming day consists of almost exclusively locally originating programming with a few exceptions (Cowboy Corner, Old Time Radio, The Cowboy Show, and a few other shows). WOON's format is "full-service" meaning it mixes news/talk and music (in WOON's case: oldies & Adult Contemporary among others).

Technical parameters
WOON operates on 1240 kHz with an unlimited power level of 1,000 watts unlimited hours, diplexing off of the WNRI tower. Originally it was licensed at 250 watts, later upgrading to 1,000 watts day/250 watts night before receiving authorization to increase nighttime power to 1,000 watts as well.

Programming
WOON is a full service station. On weekdays WOON begins with morning host Joe Callahan followed by a roundtable discussion program entitled "Coffee An'". Coffee An' is billed by the station as the longest running panel discussion program in American Radio. Following that, WOON's programs consist of a nutrition show, a nostalgia show ("Do You Remember?"), an Astrology show, old-time radio, a midday music/trivia/interview show, varied programs in the mid-afternoon & evening. Weekend programs consist of easy listening music and oldies as well as sports and programs in the Portuguese, Polish & Spanish languages. WOON also serves as the home station for Bryant University athletics & Woonsocket Villanovans sports.

Internet-only stations
Besides its primary AM signal on 1240 kHz, it operates several internet stations including all-news "O-N2", all-sports "O-N3", and internet TV station "O-N TV" plus an on-demand service.

History

1940s
WWON signs on the air with 250 watts (day & night) on November 11, 1946 as Woonsocket's lone radio station. It would add F.M. service with WWON-FM/105.5 on June 26, 1949.

1970s
WWON is listed as a Mutual Network affiliate along with WWON-FM in 1976.
Current morning personality Dave Richards takes over the slot in 1978.

1980s
WWON is part of the Boston Bruins Radio Network. Later that decade, the F.M. station is spun off from the A.M. & becoming WWKX.

1990s

On February 3, 1992 WWON changes calls to WOON after that call becomes available.

2010s
On July 24, 2018 WOON added FM service on 99.5 via translator W258DU.

FM translator

References

1992 Broadcasting & Cable Marketplace, p. A-306
Notice about WOON carrying Celtics games when WEEI-FM is carrying Red Sox Games on the WEEI Celtics Radio Network page

External links

OON
Full service radio stations in the United States
Radio stations established in 1946
Woonsocket, Rhode Island
1946 establishments in Rhode Island